Fangmatan is an archeological site located near Tianshui in China's Gansu province. The site was located within the Qin state, and includes several burials dating from the Warring States period through to the early Western Han.

Tomb 1
The date of the burial of Tomb 1 was approximately 230 to 220 BCE at the very end of the Warring States period; it was excavated in 1986. The tomb contained a number of long-lost texts written on bamboo slips, including almanacs (Rishu 日書), legal texts, medical works, and seven maps. The maps are drawn in black ink on four rectangular pieces of pine wood, 26.7 cm in length and between 15 and 18.1 cm in width, and depict the tributary river systems of the Jialing River in modern Sichuan province.  The areas covered by the seven maps overlap, but in total they cover 107 × 68 km in area.

Tomb 5

Tomb 5, which was also excavated in 1986, dates to the early Western Han (early 2nd century BCE).  The occupant of the tomb was buried with a paper map laid on his chest, but due to water damage only a single fragment (5.6 × 2.6 cm) of the map has survived.  The map, which depicts topographic features such as mountains, waterways and roads, is drawn on the oldest extant piece of paper.

Notes

Bibliography

.
.

Archaeological sites in China